A corpse is a dead human body.

Corpse may also refer to:

 The Corpse, a 1971 British horror film
 The Corpse, a black ops group within the Green Lantern Corps
Corpse Husband, also known as Corpse, American YouTuber and rapper

People with the surname
 Keli Corpse (born 1974), Canadian retired professional ice hockey player

See also
 Corpse paint, a style of black and white makeup used by black metal bands
 Corpse plant, a plant with the smell of a rotting animal
 Corpsing, theatrical slang for an actor breaking character during a scene, usually by laughing
 Corps, a military grouping
 Carcass (disambiguation)
 Cadaver (disambiguation)
 Carrion (disambiguation)